The BVG Class A3 is a train that is built after the World War II, on the smaller profile trains. Smallest operationally mobile unit is the double-rail car, which consists of a control car (S-car) with straight carriage number and a compressor car (K-car) with odd car number. Both vehicles are motorized and each equipped with a cab, the term "control car" refers to the local facilities for electrical control. The K-wagon contains the compressed air system, the converter system and the lighting equipment. The numbering was carried out by car 999/998 backwards, which 999/998 is the oldest A3 unit. Until the late 1970s, the K-car was reserved for non-smokers, in the S-car was allowed to smoke.

A3 type cars
After World War II a new batch of vehicles became necessary - the trains had been badly damaged in the war. As early as 1953, the BVG-West was busy with the construction of a new large profile series, the later D series. After the first delivery in 1957, the transport companies worked together with the DWM on the construction of a D-type similar small profile series. The result was the A3, which largely matched its model except for the adjustments for the different profile. The first vehicles were delivered in 1960, a total of eight double railcars designated as A3 60 substructure. These wagons were also among the few that drove to East Berlin before the construction of the Berlin Wall on August 13, 1961.

At this point the new A3 type, modelled on its big Großprofil brother D, was designed. There were three batches of this type in the years 1960/61, 1964 and 1966. However, because these were built from steel, the new trains required a large amount of electricity.

In 1960, the A3-60 used to deploy on Line B I and A I for a start. After the construction of Berlin Wall, A3-60 trains were only allowed to run on Line B I (Schlesches Tor - Ruhleben). It used to run to Pankow until the Berlin Wall was built on 13 August 1961. The A3-64 was deployed on Line A III and A I again.

A3 trains underwent refurbishment for A3-64 and A3-66 from 2003 to 2006, known as A3E, but 8 trains were scrapped in 2000. Those train numbers were 482/483–536/537.

A3L type cars

So, based on the A3, the A3L type built from aluminium was developed.

The first A3L66 trains was deployed in 1966, and it replaced all the older train cars from 1906 to 1913, on the U2. These are replaced in 2000. Originally, the A3 and A3L twin-wagons bore all-round moldings below the edges of the windows, all of which were removed in the late 1970s. The presence of the trims was not a criterion for the train composition, in the transitional period mixed trains occurred.

The second A3L67 trains was deployed in 1967, and it replaced all the older A I train cars, on the U3 and U4. These are replaced in 2006. The aluminium car body had showed series of wear and tear, so the upgrade would not have paid off.

The third batch of A3L71 trains was deployed in 1971, and it replaced all the older A II train cars, on the U2. In mid-2011, the BVG announced that from 2014 pre-series trains of a new series will be tested. These trains then replace the A3 / A3L series. Although currently (as of February 2016) only two preseries trains of this new IK series are delivered, which is expected to remain so until 2017, the first A3L71 cars had to be phased out in 2010 and 2015, since - similar to a few years ago for the A3L67 - the aluminium cars are now in such a bad condition that they could be refurbished at a great expense.

In 1982 the design was slightly modified, but remained compatible to the existing trains and could be used interchangeably with them. They were called A3L82. These were deployed on Line 1 (Schlesches Tor - Ruhleben). Originally they want to class them A4, but they still want to produce the A3L until 1996, and so the "A4" was eventually replaced by HK in 1999, made by Bombardier Transportation.

In the years 1993–1995 another new series of Kleinprofil trains were manufactured for the BVG, meant for their extra trains on line U1 and U2. After reunification, the two sections of the U2 had to be joined together again. As a result, the need for newer vehicles was once again created, and the BVG was already examining the first trains of the GI / 1 series due to technical defects. The resulting lack of vehicles could only be remedied by upgrading the G-cars on the one hand or procuring additional new vehicles on the other. Since the BVG originally wanted to separate from the GI / 1, she resorted to the latter measure. They were based on the A3L82, but were painted grey on the inside, unlike the earlier trains, which had wooden panelling. That was not the only change, however - they were the first Kleinprofil trains to use three-phase electric power. These trains were called A3L92. The first train, 566/567 was also retired at the same time.

In the summer of 2018, the BVG began decommissioning the A3L82, leaving two units (646/647 and 650/651) still in operation (only 14 units are decommissioned). The rest were parked in Grunewald and Friedrichsfelde and served only as spare parts donor. The last two units were retired in September 2018.

References

Berlin U-Bahn
Electric multiple units of Germany
750 V DC multiple units
Siemens multiple units
ABB multiple units